Guðrún Helgadóttir (7 September 1935 – 23 March 2022) was a prominent writer of children's literature in Iceland. She was born in Hafnarfjörður, Iceland. Her first book, Jón Oddur og Jón Bjarni, appeared in 1974 when she worked at the National Health and Insurance Office. It concerned scheming twins. Several more books in this series were released. In 1981, they became the basis for a film. By the late 1980s she won several awards, and she was nominated for the Hans Christian Andersen Award in 1988. She has written a small amount of drama for adults, but most of her work is for young children.

She was also a politician. She became the first woman to be Speaker of the Althing in 1988 and held that position until 1991. Before that she had served in the legislative assembly and held a position on the Reykjavík City Council representing the People's Alliance.

Works translated into English
 A Giant Love Story
 Flumbra: an Icelandic Folktale

References

External links
 Edda.is 
 Bokmenntir

1935 births
2022 deaths
Icelandic writers
Icelandic women writers
People from Hafnarfjörður
Icelandic women in politics
People's Alliance (Iceland) politicians
Speakers of the Althing
Grand Knights of the Order of the Falcon